A  vedette is a mounted sentry or picket, who has the function of bringing information, giving signals or warnings of danger, etc., to a main body of troops. In modern terms, the soldiers who man listening-posts are the equivalent of vedettes.

Naval
Navies use the term vedette to refer to a small scouting or patrol boat.

The term has also been used for specific naval vessels (see USS Vedette), and a class of flying boat (see Canadian Vickers Vedette).

Structures
All around Salisbury Plain in southern England, the roads connecting the plain with the surrounding countryside feature brick-built guard-posts, manned by security officers whenever there is military activity beyond such points.  They are known as vedettes, and each one is named for a local geographic feature.

The Gardjola is a prominent guard tower on Maltese forts in Malta and an example of a vedette. It may be referred to in French as an échauguette.

Notes

References

Cavalry units and formations